Chal Seyl (also Romanized as Chāl Seyl; also known as Chāl Seyl-e Cherāghābād and Chāl Seyl-e ‘Olyā) is a village in Nurabad Rural District, in the Central District of Delfan County, Lorestan Province, Iran. At the 2006 census, its population was 84, in 14 families.

References 

Towns and villages in Delfan County